The 2001 Western Kentucky Hilltoppers football team represented Western Kentucky University in the 2001 NCAA Division I-AA football season and were coached by Jack Harbaugh. This was the school's first season as a member of the Gateway Football Conference, having won the Ohio Valley Conference championship the previous year. The Hilltoppers were the preseason favorites to win the conference but finished tied for 2nd. They qualified for the NCAA Division I-AA Playoffs where they were defeated by eventual runner-up, Furman. The team was originally scheduled to play Wisconsin on September 14, however, due to the September 11 attacks, all college football games were suspended the following weekend, and the game was played on the 29th.

This team included future NFL players Joseph Jefferson, Mel Mitchell, Sherrod Coates, and Brian Claybourn. Mitchell, Eric Dandy, and Chris Price were named to the AP All American team and Jefferson was selected to play in the Blue-Gray Football Classic. The All-Conference team included Coates, Dandy, Jefferson, Mitchell, Price, Patrick Reynolds, Buster Ashley, Claybourn, Peter Martinez, Kyle Moffatt, and Daniel Withrow.

Schedule

References

Western Kentucky
Western Kentucky Hilltoppers football seasons
Missouri Valley Football Conference champion seasons
Western Kentucky Hilltoppers football